The Electoral (Integrity) Amendment Act 2018 is an Act of Parliament by the New Zealand Parliament that amends the Electoral Act 1993. The act forces the expulsion of members of the New Zealand Parliament who have left or been expelled from their party. If the member of Parliament was elected as an electorate MP, expulsion triggers a by-election. The bill was passed on 27 September 2018 as part of the coalition agreement between the Labour and New Zealand First parties and the Green Party's confidence-and-supply agreement with Labour. The Bill has been described by the media and public as the "Waka jumping bill."

Legislative features
The Electoral (Integrity) Amendment Act 2018 inserts six new clauses into the Electoral Act 1993. Section 55A states that: 
The seat of a Member of Parliament (MP) becomes vacant if they cease to be a parliamentary member of the political party for which they were elected.
If the MP delivers a written notice confirming that they have resigned their parliamentary membership of the party for which they were elected, or if they wish to stand in Parliament as an independent MP or a member of another political party. This rule does not apply to MPs elected as independent members.
This rule also applies if the defecting MP's parliamentary party leader delivers a notice confirming their resignation or expulsion to the Speaker of the New Zealand House of Representatives.

History

Background
The Electoral (Integrity) Amendment Act 2018 was intended to address the issue of waka-jumping, a New Zealand colloquialism describing the practice of MPs switching political party between elections, taking their parliamentary seat with them and upsetting the proportionality of political party representation  in the New Zealand Parliament.

In an attempt to address the issue of party switching, the Fifth Labour government had passed the Electoral (Integrity) Amendment Act 2001 with the support of Labour's coalition partner Alliance. It required any MP who had entered Parliament via a party list to resign from Parliament if they left that party's parliamentary caucus. Despite the Act's intentions, parties were still able to find legal loopholes.  When the Alliance split in 2002 due to disagreements over New Zealand's involvement in the War in Afghanistan, Jim Anderton nominally remained the leader of the Alliance within Parliament, while campaigning outside Parliament as the leader of the newly founded Progressive Party. These internal divisions within the Alliance led Prime Minister Helen Clark to call an early general election in 2002.

The Electoral (Integrity) Amendment Act 2001 was only used once to expel Labour MP Tariana Turia, who subsequently became one of the founders of the Māori Party. The 2001 Act later expired during the 2005 New Zealand general election as its sunset clause came into effect. A proposed Bill to replace the 2001 Act in 2005 failed.

First reading

On 30 January 2018, the Justice Minister Andrew Little introduced the Electoral Integrity Amendment Bill into Parliament. During the first reading, several National Party MPs including Amy Adams, Judith Collins, and Nick Smith opposed the bill, claiming that it would favor party apparatchiks over MPs' electorates and stifle democracy. The bill was defended by several government MPs including Labour MP Clare Curran, New Zealand First MP Darroch Ball and Green MP Golriz Ghahraman, who argued that it would preserve democracy by preventing party switching and upholding the proportionality of Parliament determined by electors. The Bill pass its first readings along party lines with 63 in favour (Labour, New Zealand First, and the Greens) and 57 opposed (National and the ACT Party). The bill was then referred to the Justice select committee.

Select committee

The Justice Committee received 55 submissions by early July 2018. Nine submitters supported the Electoral Integrity Amendment Bill's intentions but thought it should be limited to list MPs. Another submitter supported the Bill but recommended amendments. Six submitters including the Clerk of the New Zealand House of Representatives, Benjamin Molineux, the Legislation Design and Advisory Committee, Professor Jack Vowles, Alec van Helsdingen, and Philip Evans suggested amendments to the legislation.

The remaining 40 submitters including former National MP Lockwood Smith, blogger David Farrar, former Green MP Keith Locke, Annette Hamblett, activist Maire Leadbeater, and the National Party opposed the Bill on the grounds that it constricted the freedom of MPs to dissent from their parties and the executive. The New Zealand Human Rights Commission and the New Zealand Law Society expressed concerns that the Bill clashed with the New Zealand Bill of Rights Act 1990's provisions on free speech and association. Former Greens co-leader Jeanette Fitzsimons also expressed opposition to the Bill, stating that it "offends the freedom of conscience, freedom of speech, and freedom of association. Integrity cannot be legislated for. It is a matter of conscience and judgment."

Second reading
The Bill passed its second reading on 2 August 2018 by a margin of 63 to 57. Labour, New Zealand First and the Greens supported the Bill while the National and ACT parties opposed it.

The Bill was then submitted before a Committee of the whole House on 26 September 2018.

Third reading

The Bill passed its third and final reading on 27 September 2018 by a margin of 63 to 57. Labour, New Zealand First and the Greens supported the Bill while the National and ACT parties opposed it. The Bill was passed as part of a coalition agreement between Labour, New Zealand First and the Greens. Though the Greens opposed the Bill, they reluctantly supported it due to the terms of their confidence and supply agreement with Labour. New Zealand First' leader Winston Peters had secured the bill during coalition negotiations with Labour following the 2017 New Zealand general election.

The Bill's sponsor Andrew Little welcomed the passage of the bill, arguing that only voters should determine the parties represented in Parliament. National MP Nick Smith vowed to repeal the law if National was elected into government and attacked New Zealand First leader Winston Peters as "master-puppeteer making fools of us and a joke of this Parliament". Peters countered that MPs disagreeing with their caucus should resign and "put it on the line in a by-election." Meanwhile, Green Party leader James Shaw described the Bill as the "most difficult decision" that the party had taken over the past year but accepted it as part of their confidence and supply agreement with Labour.

Repeal attempt
On 29 July 2020, National MP David Carter submitted a member's bill called the Electoral (Integrity Repeal) Amendment Bill into Parliament, seeking to repeal the Electoral (Integrity) Amendment Act 2018 The Bill passed its first reading by 64 to 55 votes; with National, the Greens, ACT, and independent MP Jami-Lee Ross voting in favor and Labour and New Zealand First voting against. The Electoral (Integrity Repeal) Amendment Bill was then referred to the justice select committee.

The Green Party defied other government parties to support the repeal bill, infuriating Deputy Prime Minister Winston Peters who denounced the Greens as "untrustworthy" coalition partners. The Greens had previously supported the 2018 legislation due to their support agreement with Labour despite their opposition to the law. The Green's electoral spokesperson Chlöe Swarbrick defended her party's decision, stating that since the Greens had voted in favour of the bill the first time, they were free to revert to their long-standing position of opposing "waka jumping" laws. 

Following the 2020 New Zealand general election, there was a second reading of the Electoral (Integrity Repeal) Amendment Bill was held on 12 May 2021. Since David Carter had retired at the 2020 election, National MP Nick Smith sponsored the bill during its second reading. The second reading was deferred until 9 June 2021. The repeal bill was defeated by 65 (Labour) to 55 (National, Greens, ACT, and the Māori Party).

Notes and references

External links

Statutes of New Zealand
2018 in New Zealand law
Party switching